is a passenger railway station located in the city of Higashimurayama, Tokyo, Japan, operated by the private railway operator Seibu Railway.

Lines
The station also offers an interchange with Shin-Akitsu Station on the JR Musashino Line, which is a short walk away.

Station layout
The station has two ground-level side platforms serving two tracks.

Platforms

History
Akitsu Station opened on December 12, 1917.

Station numbering was introduced on all Seibu Railway lines during fiscal 2012, with Akitsu Station becoming "SI16".

Passenger statistics
In fiscal 2019, the station was the 10th busiest on the Seibu network with an average of 81,168 passengers daily. 

The passenger figures for previous years are as shown below.

Surrounding area

South exit
 Shin-Akitsu Station (Musashino Line)

North exit
 Meiji Pharmaceutical University

See also
List of railway stations in Japan
 Akitsu Station (Hiroshima), a station in Hiroshima with a similar name

References

External links

 Akitsu Station information (Seibu) 

Stations of Seibu Railway
Railway stations in Tokyo
Seibu Ikebukuro Line
Railway stations in Japan opened in 1917
Higashimurayama, Tokyo